Jane Actman (April 6, 1949 – October 26, 2018) was an American actress. She played Barbara Simms Dickerson in the short-lived television sitcom The Paul Lynde Show.

Career 
Actman began her acting career starring in the Broadway play The Prime of Miss Jean Brodie in 1968.

Later, Actman began her television career guest-starring in The Virginian on the season eight premiere titled "A Woman of Stone" as  Laurie Cantrell.

In 1972, Actman played Barbara Simms Dickerson in Paul Lynde's new comedy series The Paul Lynde Show. In 1976, she was cast in the role of Nancy Lawrence Maitland in the television drama series Family, but she was replaced by Meredith Baxter. She retired after appearing in the television series Trapper John, M.D. in 1979.

Death 
Actman died in October 2018 in New York City, at the age of 69.

Filmography

Film

Television

References

External links 

Rotten Tomatoes profile

1949 births
2018 deaths
Actresses from New York City
American film actresses
American television actresses
20th-century American actresses
21st-century American women